The Beardmore Cyclone was an aero engine produced by William Beardmore & Co with the aim of producing an engine generating a high power output at low revolutions by designing an engine of large displacement. The design did not enter volume production.

Design and development
It had a combined crankcase and cylinder block made of aluminium with steel cylinder liners and aluminium pistons. Each cylinder had its own detachable head, with two spark plugs and four valves operated by push-rods driven by a single camshaft. The compression ratio was 5.25 to 1.

The Cyclone was first run in 1922, producing 700 hp (522  kW) at 1,220 rpm. Further development increased output to 850 hp (634 kW) at 1,350 rpm but could produce 950 hp (708 kW) at the same rpm with a larger carburettor.

Variants
The Beardmore Typhoon was an inverted version of the Cyclone, with almost all parts being interchangeable between the two engines. It was test flown in Avro Aldershot J6852 in January 1927.

A compression ignition version of the Typhoon was projected and was the original choice of power-plant for the R101 airship, but this version proved impractical.

Specifications

See also

References

Cyclone
1920s aircraft piston engines